Quand nos Aïeux brisèrent leurs entraves ("When our Fathers Broke Their Chains") was the unofficial national anthem of Haiti from 1893 to 1903. The lyrics were written by Oswald Durand, a Haitian writer and poet.

History
The Quand nos Aïeux brisèrent leurs entraves was originally a poem written by Oswald Durand. In 1893, a visiting German warship set course to the Haitian capital of Port-au-Prince to stopover and by protocol that required that a national anthem be performed. At the time, Haiti did not have an anthem, so the composer Occide Jeanty offered to compose music to the patriotic poem and it was completed later that night. It debuted aboard the ship. It remained as an unofficial national anthem until La Dessalinienne officially became the national anthem commemorating the 100th year anniversary of the Haitian Revolution on January 1, 1904. The anthem still remains in use as a presidential salute.

Lyrics

See also
La Dessalinienne
Flag of Haiti
Haïti Chérie
Music of Haiti

References 

1893 songs
Haitian songs
French-language songs
Haitian patriotic songs
National symbols of Haiti